Legacy Mount Hood Medical Center is a hospital in Gresham in the U.S. state of Oregon. Established in 1959, the 115-bed facility in the Portland metropolitan area is owned by the nonprofit Legacy Health. Originally a for-profit hospital, it moved to its current campus in 1984.

History
Gresham General Hospital opened in July 1959 in downtown Gresham at a former nursing home that opened in 1934. Gresham General was a private, for-profit facility owned by Ben F. Doerksen and his wife built as a 52-bed facility for a cost of $500,000. Metropolitan Hospitals, parent company for Emanuel Hospital, purchased the hospital in 1971 and renamed it as Gresham Community Hospital, and by 1973 it had grown to a 113-bed facility. Earlier in 1971 Emanuel and several other hospitals joined to form Metropolitan Hospitals, which in 1989 became Legacy Health through another merger. In November 1984, Gresham's hospital moved to its current location on Southeast Stark Street in 1984, when it was renamed as Mount Hood Medical Center. The new $15.6 million facility was five stories and had 107 beds.

Construction on a second medical office building on the campus started in 1998. In 2001, the hospital added a permanent MRI machine, replacing a mobile unit that had previously been used. The next year the imaging department completed an expansion that doubled the size and also added a CAT scan machine. In 2003, Mount Hood Medical Center started construction on a $3 million expansion of the maternity department. In 2023, under the guidance of newly hired president Bahaa Wanly, the twice expanded maternity department was suddenly shuttered and Bahaa Wanly was then promoted to president of Legacy Emanuel. The hospital opened an expanded 29-bed,  emergency department in 2009.

Operations
Legacy Mount Hood Medical Center has 115 licensed beds, but only operates 91 of them. 

The hospital serves the eastern portions of Multnomah County in the Portland area. 

Part of Legacy Health, the state of Oregon classifies the hospital as a DRG hospital.

Services at the facility include emergency services, maternity(Shut down in 2023 due to providers not wanting to follow a new model and walked out), surgery, radiology, breast health, cardiac rehabilitation, and orthopedic services.

For 2013, the hospital had a total of 5,848 discharges, with 20,493 patient days, and 41,501 emergency department visits, plus 93,254 outpatient days. Also that year were 1,027 births and 1,526 inpatient surgeries. In 2013 Mount Hood Medical Center had $319,752,501 in gross patient revenues, provided $25,853,578 in charity care, had $110,376,379 total in operating expenses, and an income of $2,030,716.

References

External links
 Legacy Mount Hood Medical Center – U.S. News & World Report

1959 establishments in Oregon
Hospitals established in 1959
Buildings and structures in Gresham, Oregon
Hospitals in Oregon
Hospital buildings completed in 1984
Legacy Health